Fixer Upper may refer to:

Fixer-upper, a real-estate term for a property that is in need of repair
"Fixer Upper" (song), a song from the 2013 film Frozen
Fixer Upper (TV series), a 2013 TV series aired on HGTV
"Fixer Upper", an episode of the sitcom The King of Queens
The Fixer Uppers, a 1935 short film featuring Laurel and Hardy

See also
Fix-up (disambiguation)